Cairo is a 1963 American crime film directed by Wolf Rilla and written by Joan LaCour Scott. The film stars George Sanders, Richard Johnson, Faten Hamama, John Meillon, Ahmed Mazhar, Eric Pohlmann and the director's father Walter Rilla. The film was released on August 21, 1963, by Metro-Goldwyn-Mayer. The film is a nearly scene-by-scene remake of John Huston's The Asphalt Jungle.

Plot
Mastermind Brit criminal Major Pickering arrives in Cairo by air from a Greek prison, on a phony passport. The Major has a foolproof scheme to rob King Tut's jewels, which are displayed in the secure Cairo Museum and worth a quarter of a million dollars.

Through his contact man Nicodemos, the shady casino operator brother of the Major's Greek cellmate (a con artist and passport illustrator), he rounds up a disparate gang to execute the daring heist. The only gang member known to the Major is the reliable countryman and fellow soldier, an explosive expert safe-cracker, Willy (John Meillon), now a family man.  Married to a native and reluctant to go on the caper until persuaded by a fast $25,000 cut.

Nicodemos gets untrustworthy import-export businessman Kuchuk to finance the caper, while the Major hires lazy coffee shop owner Kerim as driver and his hashish smoking hot-headed gun-wielding small-time stick-up man Ali as his enforcer. Ali looks upon it as his last chance to buy a sugar cane farm in his country birthplace, and pretends to be indifferent to the unconditional love shown to him by the penniless hard-luck nice girl belly dancer Amina.

The boys go through the sewer as planned, but inside the museum an alarm is accidentally triggered and brings the police before they can make a clean escape. It results in Willy being fatally shot and dropped off at home. When the robbers that evening go to exchange the jewels for the money, Kuchuk and his gun wielding accomplice Ghattas pull a double-cross, and in an ensuing shoot-out Ghattas is dead and Ali seriously wounded, with Kuchuk now forced by the Major to make a deal with the police for $200,000 or they will melt down the invaluable jewels.

When the frightened Nicodemos is intimidated by the persistent police commandant and Kuchuk commits suicide, the rest of the gang is rounded up before they can escape from Cairo—with Ali dying in Amina's arms just as they reach by car his father's farm and the Major captured alive when staying too long to admire another belly dancer as the police raid the area.

Cast 
 George Sanders as The Major
 Richard Johnson as Ali
 Faten Hamama as Amina
 John Meillon as Willy
 Ahmed Mazhar as Kerim
 Eric Pohlmann as Nicodemos
 Walter Rilla as Kuchuk
 Kamal el-Shennawi as Ghattas 
 Salah Nazmi as Commandant
 Shwikar as Marie
 Mona Saxena as Bamba
 Abdel Khalek Saleh as Assistant Minister
 Said Abu Bakr as Osman
 Salah Mansour as Doctor
 Mohamed El Sayed as First Officer
 Yousuf Shaaban as Second Officer
 Ezzat El Alaili as Third Officer
 Mohamed Abdel Rahman as Fourth Officer
 Nahed Sabri as First Dancer 
 Aziza Hassan as Second Dancer

Production
The film reunited the star, producer and director of Village of the Damned (1960).

Filming took place in mid 1962 and involved location shooting in Cairo.

See also
 List of American films of 1963

References

External links 
 
 
 
 

1963 films
1963 crime films
American crime films
Films based on American novels
Films based on works by W. R. Burnett
Films directed by Wolf Rilla
Films set in Cairo
Films shot in Egypt
Metro-Goldwyn-Mayer films
1960s English-language films
1960s American films